John Fitzgerald (1914 – 7 October 1994) was an Irish Labour Party politician. A farmer and salesman, he was elected to Seanad Éireann by the Agricultural Panel at the 1961 Seanad election, and was re-elected in 1965, 1969 and 1973. He did not contest the 1977 Seanad election.

References

1914 births
1994 deaths
Labour Party (Ireland) senators
Members of the 10th Seanad
Members of the 11th Seanad
Members of the 12th Seanad
Members of the 13th Seanad
Irish farmers